45 Squadron or 45th Squadron may refer to:

 No. 45 Squadron RAF, a unit of the United Kingdom Royal Air Force 
45th Fighter Squadron, a soon to be activated unit of the United States Air Force 
 45th Reconnaissance Squadron, a unit of the United States Air Force 
 45th Airlift Squadron, a unit of the United States Air Force

See also
 45th Division (disambiguation)
 45th Brigade (disambiguation)
 45th Regiment (disambiguation)